Khair is a town and a municipal board in Aligarh district in the Indian state of Uttar Pradesh.
Khair is the biggest town of Aligarh district. It is situated around 27 km from Aligarh, 114 km from Delhi and 60 km from Mathura.

History
It was held by Amar Singh Jat during the 17th century. Amar Singh revolted against the Mughal Empire and declared his independent. He also built the fortress of Rait and became the leaders of all the rebels of Tappal, Khurja, Koel, Chandausi and Atrauli parganas.

Demographics
As of 2011 Indian Census, Khair had a total population of 35,751, of which 19,019 were males and 16,732 were females. Population within the age group of 0 to 6 years was 5,322. The total number of literates in Khair was 20,334, which constituted 56.9% of the population with male literacy of 63.4% and female literacy of 49.4%. The effective literacy rate of 7+ population of Khair was 66.8%, of which male literacy rate was 74.5% and female literacy rate was 58.0%. The Scheduled Castes and Scheduled Tribes population was 6,485 and 6 respectively. Khair had 5883 households in 2011.

Education
 lalit institute, khair (computer).
 Panchsheel City School Khair

See also 
 Malipura, Khair
 List of cities in Uttar Pradesh NEW BASTI

References

Cities and towns in Aligarh district